Qeshlaq-e Mohammad Beyg-e Olya (also Romanized as Qeshlāq-e Moḩammad Beyg-e ‘Olyā; also known as Qeshlāq-e Moḩammad Beyk-e ‘Olyā and Qeshlaq-e Mohammad Beyk-e Bala (also Romanized as Qeshlāq-e Moḩammad Beyk-e Bālā) is a village in Hir Rural District, in the Hir District of Ardabil County, Ardabil Province, Iran. At the 2006 census, its population was 146 in 32 families.

References 

Towns and villages in Ardabil County